Kirkelig Kulturverksted (KKV) is a Norwegian company and record label, founded in 1974 by Erik Hillestad. Among the musicians who have issued records on the label are Ketil Bjørnstad, Kari Bremnes, Erik Bye, Ole Paus, Sigvart Dagsland, Bjørn Eidsvåg, Knut Reiersrud, Deeyah and SKRUK.

Artists

Arild Andersen
Arne Domnérus
Carola
Dronning Mauds Land
Elle Melle
Erik Bye
Farmers Market
Henning Sommerro
Iver Kleive
Kari Bremnes
Karoline Krüger
Katia Cardenal
Kjetil Bjerkestrand
Knut Reiersrud
Lars Bremnes
Lars Lillo-Stenberg
Lill Lindfors
Maria Solheim
Mahsa Vahdat
Morten Harket
Ole Paus
Rim Banna
Sigvart Dagsland
SKRUK
Sondre Bratland
Susanne Lundeng
Tom Russel
Tore Brunborg

See also 
 Kulturkirken Jakob
 Lullabies from the Axis of Evil

References

External links
Kirkelig Kulturverksted's website

Norwegian record labels
Record labels established in 1974
1974 establishments in Norway